Najmabad is a village in Najmabad Rural District, in the Central District of Nazarabad County, Alborz Province, Iran. At the 2006 census, its population was 3,932, in 939 families.

The 14th-century author Hamdallah Mustawfi listed Najmabad as one of the main villages in the district of Sāvojbolāgh.

References 

Populated places in Nazarabad County